Queen of Heaven Cemetery is a Roman Catholic cemetery in Hillside, Illinois, a suburban community near Chicago.  The cemetery is operated by the Archdiocese of Chicago.

Queen of Heaven is located at Wolf and Roosevelt Roads, near the Eisenhower Expressway (Interstate 290), and is adjacent to another Catholic cemetery, Mount Carmel Cemetery.

History
Queen of Heaven was consecrated in 1947. The cemetery maintained its own office until 1965, when operations were combined with neighboring Mount Carmel Cemetery. There are approximately 3,215 annual interments at Queen of Heaven.

In addition to regular graves, Queen of Heaven was the first area cemetery to have religious shrine sections.  One of these is the "Shrine of the Holy Innocents," where young victims of the 1958 Our Lady of the Angels School Fire are interred.  In these sections families could purchase plots for all its members all at once, and not incur future charges.

Queen of Heaven Mausoleum, at the northeast corner of the cemetery, has 30,000 crypts and 64 columbarium niches.  There is also a garden crypt complex, with 25,729 crypts and 720 columbarium niches.

The Queen of Heaven mausoleum complex has room for over 33,000 bodies and was as of 2009 about 75 percent filled. Present is huge gallery of stained glass, statuary and carved wood and statuary in marble, bronze and mosaic. The art in the west wing of the main building was carried out mostly by DaPrato Studios of Chicago, with an international array of artists/architectural designers,(including a few from the Chicago area) artists such as: Italo Botti, Angelo Gherardi (Italy/US), Urano Bottari (Italy/US), Laurence Campbell (Ireland), Professor Emeritus Peter Bagnolo (Oak Park, Illinois), and a number of others.

Notable interments
 Frank Annunzio – U.S. Representative
 George Kirby – comedian and impressionist
 George Binks – baseball player
 Chet Bulger – football player
 Dick Drott – baseball player
 Nick Etten – baseball player
 Lawrence Jenco
 Celeste Lizio
 James Michels 
 Thomas O'Brien – politician
 Francis S. Peabody, founder, and son Stuyvesant 'Jack' Peabody, executives of Peabody Coal Company, now Peabody Energy
 Angelo Poffo – professional wrestler and wrestling promoter
 Johnny Rigney – baseball player
 Daniel J. Ronan – U. S. Representative
 Elmer Vasko – hockey player
 Bill Wightkin – football player
 Mark Venturini – Actor, Friday the 13th, Part 5, Return of the Living Dead

Organized crime figures
 Tony Accardo – Chicago mobster
 Joseph Aiuppa – Chicago mobster
 Sam Battaglia – Associate of Al Capone
 Paul Ricca – Chicago mobster
 Sam DeStefano – Chicago mobster
 Anthony Spilotro – Chicago mobster

References

External links
 Catholic Cemeteries of Chicago
 

Roman Catholic cemeteries in Illinois
Roman Catholic Archdiocese of Chicago
Cemeteries in Cook County, Illinois
1947 establishments in Illinois